Siuntio St. Peter's Church (fin. Siuntion Pyhän Pietarin kirkko, swe. Sjundeå S:t Petri kyrka) is a gothic medieval stone church in Siuntio, Uusimaa, Finland, located in the old church village of Siuntio. The church is built out of grey stone between the years 1460 and 1480 next to a small stone chapel which was owned by a nearby Suitia Manor. St. Peter's Church is divided into three naves by three pairs of pilars that hold the brick vaults.

The church is owned by the Parish Union of Siuntio and shared by the Finnish-speaking and Swedish-speaking Evangelical-Lutheran parishes of Siuntio. The church is part of both the Diocese of Espoo and the Diocese of Borgå since the Finnish-speaking parish is part of the Espoo Diocese and the Swedish-speaking parish is part of the Borgå Diocese.

The church has been ravaged by fire four times.

History

Catholic period 
St. Peter's Church was built next to Suitia Manor's stone chapel between 1460s and 1480s. The old chapel from the 14th century was transformed into sacristy. Originally the church was Roman Catholic. In the beginning of the 16th century the wooden ceiling inside the church was replaced with large brick vaults. Archeologist have found traces of a medieval altar and two side altars.

During catholic period paintings describing biblical legends were painted on the walls and vaults of the church.

In 1526 St. Peter's Church was hit by a lightning which caused a large fire in the church.

Reformation 
During Reformation the medieval paintings on the walls and vaults were not overpainted. Not many objects were either confiscated to the Swedish Crown and no sculptures picturing saints were destroyed.

The church caught fire again in 1617.

The Great Northern War 
Siuntio St. Peter's Church was badly damaged during the Great Northern War. The church was robbed and the bell tower was destroyed. Even the church bells were taken. The vicar and the chaplain fled to Sweden and only the chaplain's assistant stayed in Siuntio. It was only during the 1730s when the reparation of the church was able to be carried out.

Age of Enlightenment 
The church was burning once again in 1823. After the fire St. Peter's church was heavily modified following the eras architectural ideals in the Grand Duchy of Finland; the windows were enlarged and the pilars holding the medieval vaults were rounded. The oldest part of the church, the former Suitia Manor's chapel, was torn down together with the church porch. Also the medieval paintings were painted over with white oil paint.

Church paintings 
The paintings on the vaults and walls of the St. Peter's Church were painted in two phases during the end of the 15th century and the beginning of the 16th century. The paintings told the biblical stories for the illiterate part of the population.

The oldest paintings are the consecration crosses from the end of the 15th century. There are altogether six consecration crosses remaining in the church. The later paintings are paintings of the biblical legends and saints and these paintings were painted during the beginning of the 16th century.

The paintings were never over painted during the Reformation but later during the Age of Enlightenment. In 1938 the parish decided to restore the old paintings but sadly they were badly damaged especially on the walls.

Rare paintings in the church 
There are two rare topics among the paintings of St. Peter's Church. One is the crowning of St. Mary in Heaven and the other is a man with all seven deadly sins coming out if his mouth in forms of snakes.

Interior

Pulpits 
There are two pulpits from the 17th century in St. Peter's Church.

The older one is so called Pulpit of Tott from the year 1625. There are only a few parts remaining of this pulpit and these parts are on display in the church. The Pulpit of Tott was donated to the church by lord of the Sjundby Manor, Åke Tott, and the Queen Consort Catherine of Sweden. The pulpit has coats of arms of Queen Catherine, the House of Tott and the House of Vasa painted on it.

The newer pulpit was donated by president of the Royal Court in Turku, baron Ernst Johan Creutz in 1683. This pulpit is a replica of a pulpit that once stood in the Cathedral of Turku down to the fire of Turku during the 17th century. The pulpit was made by Henrik Mattsson Leino and Matts Reiman. The pulpit is considered to be the greatest pulpit that Reiman ever made.

Baptismal font 
The baptismal font, made out of limestone, is from medieval era; it was donated to the church by lady Hebbla Siggesdotter Sparre in memory of his husband Councilor of the State, lord Erik Fleming, who owned the Suitia Manor, in 1550. This baptismal font is the latest item linked to the medieval baptism tradition in Finland.

Coats of arms 
There were altogether 34 coats of arms that belonged to different noble houses in the church, but only three remain to this day. The coats of arms were used to commemorate the deceased member of the family who was buried under the church floor to family grave. After the burial the coat of arms was hanged on the wall of the church.

The remaining coats of arms are:
 Baron Ernst Johan Creutz
 Otto Mauritz Krebs
 Margareta Anrep af Soor

Burial chapel 
In 1774 lady Maria Reuterholm was granted permission to build a burial chapel out of granite in touch to the church. When Finland became under rule of the Russian Empire, the Reuterholm family emptied the chapel and left for Sweden. They didn't want anything to do with Finland anymore.

After the fire in 1823, the sacristy was moved to the then-already empty burial chapel.

Altar painting 

The altar painting in Siuntio church represents Jesus in Gethsemane. The painting was donated to the church by lady Reuterholm in 1773 for payment of the burial chapel. The painting has been painted in Stockholm but the artist is unknown. The altar painting is decorated with coats of arms of the Reuterholm and the Gyllenestjerna families.

Organ 
Siuntio St. Peter's Church was the first rural church in Finland to get its own organ. This happened in 1786. The current organ is the church's third organ, and it is made by organ factory Paul Ott from Germany in 1971.

Church textiles 
The newest church textiles have been made by textile artist Helena Vaari in 2009 after the renovation of the church.

See also 
 Siuntio Church Village
 Diocese of Espoo
 Diocese of Borgå
 Evangelical Lutheran Church of Finland

References 

Lutheran churches in Finland
Lutheran churches converted from Roman Catholicism
Medieval stone churches in Finland
Siuntio